Matti Saarinen (1946/1947 – 12 July 2021) was a Finnish politician who served as an MP.

References

1940s births
2021 deaths
Finnish politicians
Finnish soldiers
Members of the Parliament of Finland (1987–91)
Members of the Parliament of Finland (1995–99)
Members of the Parliament of Finland (1999–2003)
Members of the Parliament of Finland (2003–07)
Members of the Parliament of Finland (2007–11)
Members of the Parliament of Finland (2011–15)
Social Democratic Party of Finland politicians
People from Lohja